Antwerp District coincides with the old city of Antwerp. Since the municipality and contemporary city of Antwerp in the Flemish Region of Belgium was decentralized in 2000, this district level of government steadily increased its administrative powers.

It comprises 22 neighbourhoods:
 Antwerpen Noord (with Stuivenberg, Seefhoek, Amandus-Atheneum, Chinatown)
 Brederode
 Centraal Station (with Kievitwijk, Diamant, Statiekwartier, Joods Antwerpen)
 Den Dam
 Eilandje
 Haringrode
 Harmonie
 Historisch Centrum
 Kiel
 Linkeroever
 Luchtbal-Rozemaai-Schoonbroek (with Luchtbal, Rozemaai, Schoonbroek)
 Markgrave
 Meir
 Middelheim
 Schipperskwartier
 Sint-Andries
 Stadspark
 Tentoonstellingswijk
 Theaterbuurt, also called Quartier Latin
 Universiteitswijk
 Zurenborg
 Zuid, also called Zuid - Museum

Districts of Antwerp